"Til the World Ends" is a song written by Dave Loggins and performed by Three Dog Night, who in 1972 had had a Top 20 hit with Loggins' "Pieces of April": produced by Bob Monaco and Jimmy Ienner and arranged by Jimmie Haskell, "Til the World Ends" was featured on the 1975 Three Dog Night album, Coming Down Your Way.

The final Top 40 hit for Three Dog Night, "Til the World Ends" reached #32 on the Hot 100 in Billboard also ranking on the magazine's Adult Contemporary chart with a #11 peak. Outside of the US, "Til the World Ends" went to #26 on the Canadian pop chart in 1975, and reached #9 on the Canadian adult contemporary chart.

References

1975 songs
1975 singles
Songs written by Dave Loggins
Three Dog Night songs
ABC Records singles